This is a list of NMBS/SNCB locomotive classes, classes of locomotive operated by the National Railway Company of Belgium:

Multi-system electric locomotives

Single-system electric locomotives

Diesel locomotives 

The class 77 are used both as line engines in up to triple units for freight trains, and as shunting engines (see below). Commutation between operation at 100 km/h maximum (line) and 60 km/h maximum (shunting) can be done while the locomotive is halted.

Diesel shunting locomotives

Electric Multiple Units

Diesel Multiple Units

Steam locomotives 

SNCB Type 1 — 4-6-2
SNCB Type 7 — 4-6-0
SNCB Type 10 – 4-6-2
SNCB Type 12 — 4-4-2
SNCB Type 16 – 2-6-0
SNCB Type 17 - 4-4-0
SNCB Type 25 – 0-6-0
SNCB Type 26 – 2-10-0
SNCB Type 29 – 2-8-0
SNCB Type 36 – 2-10-0
SNCB Type 53 – 0-8-0T
SNCB Type 58 – 0-6-0T
SNCB Type 64 – 4-6-0
SNCB Type 81 – 0-8-0
SNCB Type 98 – 0-10-0T

See also

History of rail transport in Belgium
Rail transport in Belgium
https://commons.wikimedia.org/wiki/NMBS-SNCB#Current_trains

References

National Railway Company of Belgium locomotives
SNCB multiple units
SNCB
SNCB/NMBS classes